Events in the year 1827 in Brazil.

Incumbents
 Monarch – Pedro I

Events

Births
 5 August - Deodoro da Fonseca

Deaths

References

 
1820s in Brazil
Years of the 19th century in Brazil
Brazil
Brazil